Gilbert F. Rondeau (7 March 1928 – 9 March 1994) was a Social Credit Party and Ralliement créditiste member of the House of Commons of Canada. He was born in Sainte-Élisabeth-de-Warwick, Quebec and became a businessman, industrialist and insurance agent.

Political career
Rondeau first campaigned in the 1949 federal election at the Beauharnois riding for the Union of Electors party, but did not win the seat.

His next election campaign was in the 1962 federal election where he won the Shefford riding for the Social Credit Party. After re-election to a second term in the 1963 election, Rondeau was defeated in 1965 by Liberal candidate Louis-Paul Neveu. Rondeau won the Shefford seat back in the following national election in 1968, and was re-elected in 1972 and 1974.

Being one of the few Social Credit politicians who was able to speak English, Rondeau helped represent the predominantly francophone party across Canada. But Rondeau's political career was ended by charges of Unemployment Insurance fraud for which he was convicted and sentenced to a five-month prison term. Because of these legal problems, he was ejected from the Social Credit Party in 1977 and was an independent member for the remainder of the 30th Canadian Parliament. In the 1979 election, Rondeau campaigned at Shefford as an independent but lost to Jean Lapierre of the Liberals.

Rondeau died on 9 March 1994 because of complications arising from gallstone removal surgery.

References

External links
 

1928 births
1994 deaths
Members of the House of Commons of Canada from Quebec
Social Credit Party of Canada MPs